Nottoway County Courthouse is a historic courthouse building located at Nottoway, Nottoway County, Virginia. It was built in 1843, and is a three-part Palladian plan building in the Jeffersonian or Roman Revival style brick structure.  It has a temple-form main block and features a tetrastyle Tuscan order portico.  It has flanking one-story wings.

It was listed on the National Register of Historic Places in 1973.

Gallery

References

External links

Nottoway County Courthouse, State Route 625, Nottoway Court House, Nottoway County, VA 1 photo at Historic American Buildings Survey

Historic American Buildings Survey in Virginia
Courthouses on the National Register of Historic Places in Virginia
County courthouses in Virginia
Government buildings completed in 1843
Buildings and structures in Nottoway County, Virginia
National Register of Historic Places in Nottoway County, Virginia
1843 establishments in Virginia